Peru competed in the 2019 Parapan American Games from 23 August to 1 September as the host country. In total 139 athletes were scheduled to represent the country making this its largest delegation in its history. Athletes representing Peru won five gold medals, three silver medals and seven bronze medals and the country finished in 10th place in the medal table.

Medalists

Athletics

Badminton

Men

Women

Mixed doubles

Boccia

Cycling

Football 5-a-side

Football 7-a-side

Goalball

Judo

Powerlifting

Shooting

Sitting volleyball

The men's Peruvian sitting volleyball team hope to win in the country's debut appearance in sitting volleyball.

Swimming

Table tennis

Taekwondo

Wheelchair basketball

Wheelchair tennis

See also

Peru at the 2019 Pan American Games

References

2019 in Peruvian sport
Nations at the 2019 Parapan American Games